Crescent Convention Centre is located at Chalakudy. The Crescent Convention Centre is owned by The Crescent Convention Centre Trust. The Trust acquired the land of 7.5 acres lease from Crescent Educational Society, which runs the Crescent Public School.

The Convention centre includes a lobby, an auditorium, a dining hall, a mini auditorium, a pantry, and a kitchen. Oommen Chandy, the Chief Minister of Kerala inaugurated the Crescent Convention Centre on 8 December 2012 in presence of Minister of Co-Operation C. N. Balakrishnan presided over Member of parliament K. P. Dhanapalan, Member of the Legislative Assembly B. D. Devassy.

References

External links

Convention centres in India